58 Joralemon Street, in Brooklyn Heights, Brooklyn, New York, United States, is a Greek Revival structure built in 1847 as a private residence but is now a New York City Subway vent. The Interborough Rapid Transit Company acquired the property in 1907, gutted the interior, and converted the structure to "the world’s only Greek Revival subway ventilator".

Through acquisitions, the property passed to the New York City Board of Transportation in 1940 and to the New York City Transit Authority in 1953, its current owner.  it was valued at $2.8 million.
The exterior facade and black Lexan windows are the result of a 1999 agreement with the Landmarks Preservation Commission to help the facility blend into the neighborhood, which is a city-landmarked historic district.

See also
 23-24 Leinster Gardens, a similar mock residential building that serves as a screen for a London Underground route.
 Strecker Memorial Laboratory in New York City is another transport utility disguised to blend into the area.
 , a similar ventilation facility in Paris.

References

Brooklyn Heights
Buildings and structures completed in 1847
Greek Revival architecture in New York City
New York City Subway infrastructure
Transportation buildings and structures in Brooklyn